Acrosorium papenfussii is a species of red algae described by W. R. Taylor.

References

Delesseriaceae